Tony Hinchcliffe (born June 8, 1984) is an American comedian. He has been on the writing staff of the Comedy Central Roast series. He also appeared as a roaster on the All Def Digital Roast of Snoop Dogg that aired on Fusion in 2016.

Hinchcliffe is an insult comedian. He is the host of the comedy podcast Kill Tony. His one-hour stand-up special One Shot premiered on Netflix in 2016.

Early life
Born in Youngstown, Ohio, Hinchcliffe was raised by his single mother in the city's north side.  Hinchcliffe attended Ursuline High School, graduating in 2002 where he was on the wrestling team. 

Hinchcliffe told the Free Times of Columbia, South Carolina that he grew up in a tough neighborhood and that he first developed roasting as a defense mechanism. In an interview with Cleveland.com he said that his insults also got him punched in the face on the school bus on his first day of school.

Career
In 2007, Hinchcliffe moved to Los Angeles in order to pursue a career in comedy. He started performing stand-up at open mics at The Comedy Store in West Hollywood, California. He was hired to work the phones and the cover booth, eventually becoming a paid regular at the venue. He also started opening for comedians Joe Rogan and Jeff Ross on tour.

Hinchcliffe became known at The Comedy Store for insulting other comics and audience members during shows. He is also known for broaching uncomfortable and sensitive topics during his stand-up sets. Hinchcliffe's style of roasting and dark sense of humor appealed to fellow comedian Jeff Ross, also known as the "Roastmaster General" of the television series Comedy Central Roast. Hinchcliffe refers to Ross as his "mentor" and he helped get Hinchcliffe his first writing jobs.

Hinchcliffe has written for the Comedy Central Roasts of James Franco, Justin Bieber and Rob Lowe. Hinchcliffe's contributions to the series include writing Martha Stewart's set for the Justin Bieber roast and Ann Coulter's set for the Rob Lowe roast. Hinchcliffe has also written for the comedy panel show The Burn with Jeff Ross and appeared as a contestant on the first season of Jeff Ross Presents Roast Battle.

Since 2013, Hinchcliffe has produced and hosted a podcast called Kill Tony, a weekly live show recorded at The Comedy Store. During the show Hinchcliffe and co-host Brian Redban (of The Joe Rogan Experience and the Deathsquad Network), along with a changing panel of comedians and other celebrities, act as judges for amateur comedians. The contestants enter their names into a bucket and are selected at random throughout the show. Each selected contestant gets to perform a one-minute comedy set, followed by a discussion and critique by the panel of judges. The podcast streams live to YouTube.

In 2016, Hinchcliffe appeared as a roaster on the Roast of Snoop Dogg presented by All Def Digital (a media-company owned by Russell Simmons) that aired on Fusion network. In December of the same year he launched a podcast called The Pony Hour. Guest of his show have included MMA fighters Brendan Schaub and Nate Diaz, UFC announcer Bruce Buffer, actor David Arquette and comedian Big Jay Oakerson. The show gets its name from Hinchcliffe's nickname "The Golden Pony" and it consists of one hour interviews with each of his guests. The nickname, "Golden Pony" comes from his times at The Comedy Store with colleague and friend Benji Aflalo. In Episode 22 of Kill Tony, Aflalo mentions that Hinchcliffe never wanted to play the game, Risk, with him and other comics, so they would refer to him as the "golden pony" which is a piece in the game. 

Hinchcliffe's first one-hour stand-up special titled One Shot premiered on Netflix in 2016. His special was so named because it was shot in one camera take with no edits.

In 2017, he headlined the Monster Energy Outbreak Tour where he toured 20 American cities in 22 days.

In September 2020, Hinchcliffe announced that he would be relocating to Austin, Texas to join Joe Rogan and Brian Redban. The podcast, Kill Tony, previously filmed at The Comedy Store, relocated to the historic Antone's Nightclub in downtown Austin, Texas. The show relocated to Vulcan Gas Company on 6th street in May 2021.

Controversy 
In May 2021, Hinchcliffe was videotaped insulting Peng Dang, an Asian American comedian who had introduced Hinchcliffe after performing the previous set at Vulcan Gas Company in Austin. Hinchcliffe referred to Dang as a "filthy little fucking chink", followed with a series of Asian stereotypes in a mock Chinese accent, and lashed out at audience members who laughed at Dang's jokes, branding them as "race traitors". The video was later shown on Twitter, resulting in heavy backlash against Hinchcliffe.  Hinchcliffe was reportedly dropped by his agency WME and removed from two scheduled shows with Joe Rogan in Austin due to the controversy.

In an interview with Dang, Vulture reported that during his set, Hinchcliffe stated that Chinese people came to Austin because of the bats and criticized offended audience members for "believing he was serious". Dang said that he did not receive any apology from Hinchcliffe following the incident.

Comedy specials

References

External links

1984 births
Living people
American stand-up comedians
21st-century American comedians